Noctubourgognea is a genus of moths of the family Noctuidae.

Selected species
Noctubourgognea bicolor (Mabille, 1885)
Noctubourgognea coppingeri (Butler, 1881)
Noctubourgognea glottuloides (Butler, 1882)

References
Natural History Museum Lepidoptera genus database

Noctuinae